is a multipurpose athletic facility located in Izumi-ku, Sendai, Japan.  Managed by the city of Sendai, it can be configured for softball, futsal and tennis, among other sports.  International events, such as exhibition matches between the United States women's softball team and Japan, have taken place there, and the facility has also hosted concerts by SMAP and other artists.

It is named for its seashell-like appearance.  The entire southern half (outfield, when configured for softball) is capable of rotating around the outside of the rest of the stadium, giving an open-air feel at times.

Completed in 2000, the facility has a total of 21,324 m² of enclosed space spread across four levels, including the entrance hall, locker rooms, permanent and temporary seating areas, and the main athletic ground, which is 13,132 m² in size.  Up to 1050 seats are available for spectator matches, although most of the time the grounds are being used by residents of the city for recreational purposes.

Part of a larger athletic compound, including several other tennis courts, a gymnasium, and the practice fields for Vegalta Sendai, Shellcom Sendai is located approximately 25 minutes by foot from Izumi-Chūō Station, on the Sendai Subway Nanboku Line; and less than five minutes from the Izumi parking area ETC exit of the Tōhoku Expressway.

External links

  Shellcom Sendai information

Sports venues in Sendai
Indoor arenas in Japan
Softball venues
Covered stadiums in Japan
Baseball venues in Japan
Sports venues completed in 2000
2000 establishments in Japan